Mass games or mass gymnastics are a form of performing arts or gymnastics in which large numbers of performers take part in a highly regimented performance that emphasizes group dynamics rather than individual prowess.

North Korea

Mass games are now performed only in the Rungrado May Day Stadium but in the '90s there were mass games held at the Kim Il-sung Stadium and in the Pyongyang Gymnasium. Mass Games can basically be described as a synchronized socialist-realist spectacular, featuring over 100,000 participants in a 90-minute display of gymnastics, dance, acrobatics, and dramatic performance, accompanied by music and other effects, all wrapped in a highly politicized package. Students practiced every day from January onwards. The 90-minute performance is held every evening at 7pm and features the 'largest picture in the world' a giant mosaic of individual students each holding a book whose pages links with their neighbours’ to make up one gigantic scene. When the students turn the pages, the scene or individual elements of the scene change, up to 170 pages make up one book.

According to Kim Jong-il, the philosophy behind the events was that:

The gymnastics exhibit the North Korean idea of "ilsim-dangyeol" (single-minded unity), as well as nationalism.

Outside North Korea

Guyana
Guyana under the leader Forbes Burnham held mass games. They were first held in February 1980 to commemorate the founding of the Co-operative Republic of Guyana.

Europe

In Germany, Friedrich Ludwig Jahn developed an efficient gymnastics method called Massenturnen. For propagating Massenturnen, Germany started .

Mass games developed alongside 19th century nationalist movements, particularly the Czech Sokol movement.

In Romania, the communist government organized compulsory mass games after Romanian Communist Party General Secretary Nicolae Ceauşescu and his wife had visited the People's Republic of China and saw such games there. These were the hardest working days of the year since every individual was required to participate along with his fellow workers. Being late on this day or not shouting the party leader's name loudly enough would lead to being reported by fellow workers to prosecutors.

In Bulgaria, mass games were occasionally held during the Zname na mira ("Flag of Peace") international youth festivals. However, Bulgaria did not have a tradition of mass games, and performances were rare.

In Yugoslavia, similar activities called Slet were organized, and one of these events was the Relay of Youth. In Yugoslavia, participation in Slet events was voluntary.

In East Germany, eight mass games called the GDR Gymnastics and Sports Festival were held in Leipzig. Participation in mass games in East Germany was voluntary, and the segments combined both Western and Eastern elements infused with German traditions.

Japan
In Japan, schools adopted German gymnastics and mass games were started. Between 1925 and 1945, mass games were played in Meiji Jingū Kyōgi Taikai (Meiji Shrine Sports Competition).

Uganda 
Ugandan dictator Idi Amin was an admirer of North Korea's Mass Games.

Current performances

Today, mass games are annually performed in North Korea, where they take place to celebrate national holidays such as the birthdays of former rulers Kim Il-sung and Kim Jong-il. In recent years, they have been the main attraction of the Arirang Festival in Pyongyang. The 2004 documentary film by VeryMuchSo Productions and Koryo Tours A State of Mind details the training of two young girls from Pyongyang who perform in the mass games.

Arirang mass games were first performed in 2002 in Pyongyang's May Day Stadium and have been held every year since – between August and October and on one occasion in Spring. The show was on 4 times a week. Tourists from all over the World were welcomed to the DPRK during Mass Games.

Sokol is a Czech gymnastics organization which runs mass games called  for Eastern European youth. The word slet means 'a gathering of falcons'.  The first Sokol slet was held in 1882 in Prague to celebrate the 20th anniversary of the founding of the Sokol organization. Since 1994 slets have been held every six years.

The opening ceremonies of the Olympic Games may also be viewed as instances of mass games.

See also
 Turners
 A State of Mind – UK produced, award winning documentary by Koryo Tours and VeryMuchSo productions in 2002, about child gymnasts in training for the Mass Games
 Government-organized demonstration
 Propaganda in North Korea
 Spartakiad (Czechoslovakia)
 World Gymnaestrada

References

Further reading

External links
Full video of mass games, September 2013
Site about mass gymnastics under communism
Mass Games and North Korea photo gallery
Professional photo series of the 2009 "Arirang" Massgames in North Korea
Sarbatori comuniste in Deva (in Romanian)
Mass Games in North Korea
Mass Games film and specialist travel to mass games Koryo Tours is the company that produced the film on the mass games 'A State of Mind' video insert on this page
 What is a Sokol "Slet"?
 Arirang Mass Games 360 VR

Images
 Arirang Mass Games North Korea

Videos
 

Propaganda in North Korea
Festivals in North Korea
North Korean culture
Tourist attractions in Pyongyang
Sokol
Sport in Czechoslovakia
Sports festivals in North Korea
East Asian traditions